Juris Māters (or Māteru Juris; 11 March 1845 – 4 February 1885) was a Latvian writer and journalist.

References

1845 births
1885 deaths
People from South Kurzeme Municipality
People from Courland Governorate
Latvian writers
19th-century writers from the Russian Empire
19th-century Latvian people